Sennar typically refers to one of two adjacent cities in the eastern Sudan near the Blue Nile.

It may also refer to:

 Sennar (state), Sudan
 Funj Sultanate (1504–1821), also called the Kingdom of Sennar
 Plain of Sennar, the lowlands along the Blue Nile west of the Ethiopian Plateau

See also
 Sennar Dam